The Delaware Fightin' Blue Hens women's basketball team represents the University of Delaware in the Colonial Athletic Association (CAA). The Fightin' Blue Hens compete as part of the National Collegiate Athletic Association (NCAA) Division I. The program has had 5 head coaches since it began play in 1969, Natasha Adair is currently the head coach.

Season by season

References

Delaware Fightin' Blue Hens
Delaware Fightin' Blue Hens basketball coaches